Coleophora denigrella is a moth of the family Coleophoridae. It is found in Afghanistan, Uzbekistan, Turkmenistan and Turkey.

The larvae feed on Alhagi sparsifolia and Alhagi canescens. They create a silky case with the anterior part down-curved. The surface is uneven, with tubercles and plumes of silky deposits. The valve are three-sided and the length is about 5 mm. The color of the larvae is brownish, but pure white for young larvae. Larvae can be found from April to October in at least three generations. Fully fed larvae hibernate.

References

denigrella
Moths described in 1930
Moths of Asia